The 2019 Guangzhou R&F season is the 9th year in Guangzhou R&F's existence and its 8th season in the Chinese football league, also its 8th season in the top flight.

Coaching and medical staff 

{|class="wikitable"
|-
!Position
!Staff
|-
|Head coach|| Dragan Stojković
|-
|rowspan="3"|Assistant coaches|| Bratislav Živković
|-
| Slobodan Marović (to July 27)
|-
| Terry Butcher (from July 27)
|-
|rowspan="3"|Fitness coaches|| Katsuhito Kinoshi
|-
| Divan Augustyn (to June)
|-
| Eran Shado (from June)
|-
|Goalkeeper coach|| Huang Hongtao
|-
|Team leader|| Huang Jun
|-
|rowspan="3"|Team physicians|| Marco van der Steen
|-
| Mai Zhiyuan
|-
| Fan Bihua
|-
|Technical analyst|| Chen Jiachao
|-
|rowspan="2"|Interpreters|| Hong Wenjie
|-
| Weng Zhanhong
|-

Squad

Winter

First team

Reserve team

Summer

First team

Reserve team

Transfers

Winter

In

Out

Summer

In

Out

R&F (Hong Kong)

Friendlies

Pre-season

Mid-season

Competitions

Chinese Super League

Table

Results by round

Results summary

League Matches

Chinese FA Cup

Statistics 
  (Friendly matches excluded)

Appearances and goals

Goalscorers

Disciplinary record

Notes

References 

Guangzhou R&F F.C.
Guangzhou City F.C. seasons